The 2013 Latvian Supercup was the first edition of the Latvian Supercup, an annual football match organised by Latvian Football Federation and contested by the reigning champions of the two main Latvian club competitions, the Latvian Higher League and the Latvian Football Cup. It was played at the Celtnieks Stadium in Daugavpils on 9 March 2013, between the 2012 Latvian Higher League winners Daugava and the 2011–12 Latvian Football Cup winners Skonto.

Venue
The Celtnieks Stadium was opened in 1989, and it is the home stadium of Latvian Higher League team BFC Daugavpils.

The net capacity of the Celtnieks Stadium is 2,000. In October 2011, the next generation artificial turf was laid on the stadium with size: 105 x 68 meters. The last renovation of the stadium took place in 2000.

Teams

Match

Details

References

External links
 Association "Latvian Football Higher League" 

Latvian Supercup
Supercup